The 1990 Dutch TT was the eighth round of the 1990 Grand Prix motorcycle racing season. It took place on the weekend of 28–30 June 1989 at the TT Circuit Assen located in Assen, Netherlands. Kevin Schwantz won the race, with Wayne Rainey in close second and Eddie Lawson in third.

500 cc classification

References

Dutch TT
Dutch
Tourist Trophy